Tetracoccus hallii is a species of flowering shrub in the family Picrodendraceae, known by the common names Hall's shrubby-spurge and Hall's tetracoccus.

Distribution
The plant is native to the Mojave Desert and Sonoran Desert: in southeastern California, southern Nevada, and western Arizona in the U.S.; and Baja California state in Mexico.

It grows in many types of desert habitat, including creosote bush scrub, at elevations below .

It is abundant and widespread in Joshua Tree National Park in Southern California.

Description
Tetracoccus hallii is a bushy, branching shrub, hairless in texture except for the new twigs, which have rough hairs. The small leaves occur in clusters along the branches, each leathery, teardrop-shaped leaf measuring just a few millimeters long.

The plant is dioecious, with male and female individuals producing different types of flowers. The staminate flowers occur in clusters, each flower with 4 to 6 rounded sepals and 4 to 8 erect stamens. The pistillate flower occurs singly.  Its bloom period is January through May, from the lower Sonoran to the higher Mojave deserts.

It produces a rounded, woolly fruit with usually three chambers. The fruit is around a centimeter long when mature and contains one or two seeds per chamber.

See also

References

External links
 Calflora Database: Tetracoccus hallii (Hall's purple bush,  Hall's shrubby spurge, Holly leaved spurge)
Jepson Manual eFlora (TJM2) treatment of Tetracoccus hallii
 USDA Plants Profile for Tetracoccus hallii (Hall's shrubby-spurge)
UC CalPhotos gallery of Tetracoccus hallii

Picrodendraceae
Flora of the California desert regions
Flora of the Sonoran Deserts
Flora of Arizona
Flora of Baja California
Flora of Nevada
Natural history of the Colorado Desert
Natural history of the Mojave Desert
Taxa named by Townshend Stith Brandegee
Flora without expected TNC conservation status